A monoxide is any oxide containing only one atom of oxygen. A well known monoxide is carbon monoxide; see carbon monoxide poisoning.  

The prefix mono (Greek for "one") is used in chemical nomenclature. In proper nomenclature, the prefix is not always used in compounds with one oxygen atom. Generally, when the oxygen is bonded to a nonmetal, the prefix mono is used. However when the oxygen atom bonds to a metal, the prefix is dropped. For instance, in the compound K2O, potassium (K) is a metal and therefore its proper name is potassium oxide, rather than potassium monoxide.  

Among monoxides, carbon monoxide is neutral, germanium(II) oxide is distinctly acidic, and both tin(II) oxide and lead(II) oxide are amphoteric.

References